Misaki Doi was the defending champion but chose not to participate.

Nuria Párrizas Díaz won the title, defeating Olga Govortsova in the final, 6–2, 6–2.

Seeds

Draw

Finals

Top half

Bottom half

References

External Links
Main Draw

Swedish Open - Singles
2021 Women's Singles